North Riverside Park Mall is a shopping mall located in North Riverside, Illinois. It is owned by The Feil Organization and the mall's anchor stores are JCPenney and Round 1 Entertainment. There are 2 vacant anchor stores last occupied by Carson's and Sears.

History
In 1975, the mall opened with 3 department stores which were JCPenney, Carson Pirie Scott, and Montgomery Ward.
Madigan's operated as a junior anchor in the mall until the early 1990s, when its space was divided between Foot Locker and TJ Maxx, both of which opened in 1994. By 2005, TJ Maxx had been closed and replaced with Steve & Barry's. After that chain went out of business in 2009, its space was taken over by Conway, a division of National Stores. In May 2015, Conway was converted into Fallas.

The Sears store was originally occupied by Montgomery Ward until that chain went out of business in 2001. The opening of Sears coincided with a $5 million renovation plan.

In December 2010, portions of the film Contagion were filmed at the mall.

In 2015, Sears Holdings spun off 235 of its properties, including the Sears at North Riverside Park Mall, into Seritage Growth Properties. In 2017, Sears downsized its store to the upper level. Its lower level is now Round One Entertainment and AMITA Health.

On April 18, 2018, it was announced that Carson's would be closing as parent company The Bon-Ton Stores was going out of business. The store closed on August 29, 2018. Fallas also closed in 2018.

In 2020, rioting affected the mall, which was still closed due to the COVID-19 pandemic, and surrounding shopping centers in North Riverside and neighboring Berwyn, resulting in break-ins, looting, and a shooting fatality on the property.

On July 1, 2020, it was announced that Sears would close in September 2020, as part of a plan to close 28 stores nationwide, leaving JCPenney as the only traditional anchor store left.

Encore Shoes opened in the former Fallas space.

Bus routes 
CTA
21 Cermak 
Pace
322 Cermak Road/22nd Street

References

External links

Shopping malls in Cook County, Illinois
Shopping malls established in 1975
1975 establishments in Illinois